Varbuse is a village in Kanepi Parish, Põlva County in southeastern Estonia. It's located about 9 km northeast of Kanepi, the centre of the municipality, and about 9 km southwest of the town of Põlva. As of 2011 census, the village's population was 30.

The Estonian Road Museum is located in the former Varbuse coaching inn.

References

External links
Estonian Road Museum
Varbuse Music Manor 

Villages in Põlva County
Kanepi Parish